Huayuanqiao is a station on Line 6 of the Beijing Subway. This station opened on December 30, 2012.

Station Layout 
The station has an underground island platform.

Exits 
There are 6 exits, lettered A, B1, B2, C, D1, and D2. Exits A and D are accessible.

Gallery

References

Beijing Subway stations in Haidian District
Railway stations in China opened in 2012